Onti ( Alone) is a 2019 Indian Kannada language action film directed by Shri. The film starring Arya and Meghana Raj, is produced by Arya under banner Sai Ram Creations. The film has cinematography by K. Shashidhar.

Cast

 Arya as Onti
 Meghana Raj as Paaru
 Devaraj
 Sharath Lohitashwa
 Girija Lokesh
 Ninasam Ashwath as Shankar
 Pawan Kumar as Kutty

Release
The official trailer of the film was released by Anand Audio on 11 June 2019.

Soundtrack

Reviews
Vinay Lokesh of Times of India gave 2 stars out of 5 stating, "Onti is a run-of-the-mill commercial drama with ample doses of action, but the story is weak and doesn’t make an impact".

References

External links
 

2019 films
2010s Kannada-language films